In Defence of Animals: The Second Wave  is a 2005 book edited by the philosopher Peter Singer.  It contains chapters by Gaverick Matheny, Richard Ryder, Paola Cavalieri, Paul Waldau and others.  The authors makes several arguments why harming animals is bad.

References 

2005 non-fiction books
Books about animal rights
Books by Peter Singer
English-language books